HD 37519 is star in the northern constellation Auriga. It has a blue-white hue and is dimly visible to the naked eye with an apparent visual magnitude of 6.04. The distance to HD 37519 is approximately 810 light years based on parallax, but it is drifting closer with a radial velocity of −10 km/s.

Cowley in 1972 found a stellar classification of B9.5III-IV(p)? (Hg?) for this star, suggesting it is an evolved B-type star and a suspected chemically peculiar star of the mercury-manganese type. It is estimated to be 375 million years old and with a high rate of spin, showing a projected rotational velocity of 195 km/s. In March 1964, a suspected flare of HD 37519 was detected that increased the star's brightness by about three magnitudes. Smaller variations of up to two magnitudes were detected a few days later, suggesting there might be a flare star companion. However, follow-up observations failed to confirm the variability. The star is radiating 110 times the luminosity of the Sun from its photosphere at an effective temperature of 8,289 km/s.

References

External links
 HR 1938
 Image HD 37519

B-type giants
B-type subgiants
Mercury-manganese stars
Flare stars

Auriga (constellation)
Durchmusterung objects
037519
026712
1938